In law, a question of law, also known as a point of law, is a question that must be answered by applying relevant legal principles to interpretation of the law. Such a question is distinct from a question of fact, which must be answered by reference to facts and evidence as well as inferences arising from those facts. Answers to questions of law are generally expressed in terms of broad legal principles and can be applied to many situations rather than be dependent on particular circumstances or factual situations. An answer to a question of law as applied to the particular facts of a case is often referred to as a conclusion of law.

In several civil law jurisdictions, the highest courts deem questions of fact as having been settled by the lower courts and will only consider questions of law. They thus may refer a case back to a lower court to re-apply the law and answer any fact-based evaluations based on their answer on the application of the law. International courts such as the Benelux Court of Justice and the European Court of Justice will only answer questions of law, asked by judges of national courts if they are not certain about the interpretation of the law of multilateral organizations.

Questions of law are resolved by a judge or equivalent, while questions of fact are resolved by a trier of fact, which in the common law system is often a jury. Conclusions of law are more readily reconsidered by an appellate court, whereas findings of fact in a common law legal system are rarely overturned.

Question of fact
In law, a question of fact, also known as a point of fact, is a question that must be answered by reference to facts and evidence as well as inferences arising from those facts. Such a question is distinct from a question of law, which must be answered by applying relevant legal principles. The answer to a question of fact (a "finding of fact") usually depends on particular circumstances or factual situations.

All questions of fact are capable of proof or disproof by reference to a certain standard of proof. Depending on the nature of the matter, the standard of proof may require that a fact be proven to be "more likely than not" (there is barely more evidence for the fact than against, as established by a preponderance of the evidence) or true beyond reasonable doubt.

Answers to questions of fact are determined by a trier of fact such as a jury, or a judge. In many jurisdictions, such as England and Wales, appellate courts generally do not consider appeals based on errors of fact (errors in answering a question of fact). Rather, the findings of fact of the first venue are usually given great deference by appellate courts.

The distinction between "law" and "fact" has proved obscure wherever it is employed. For instance, the common law used to require that a plaintiff's complaint in a civil action only state the "facts" of his case, not any "legal conclusions." Unfortunately, no one has ever been able to tell whether the allegation that "on November 9, the defendant negligently ran over the plaintiff with his car at the intersection of State Street and Chestnut Street" is a statement of fact or a legal conclusion. In fact, the distinction between law and fact is just the legal version of the philosophical distinction between "empirical" and "analytical" statements, a distinction on whose existence philosophers have been unable to agree to this day. ...

... we will see that many defendants charged with impossible attempts are not in fact attempting the crime they are charged with attempting. They merely think they are committing a crime. ...

The philosopher Alfred Lessing argues
It would be merely foolish to assert that it is of no interest whatever to know that The Disciples is a forgery. But to the man who has never heard of either Vermeer or van Meegeren and who stands in front of The Disciples admiring it, it can make no difference whether he is told that it is a seventeenth-century Vermeer or a twentieth-century van Meegeren in the style of Vermeer. And when some deny this and argue vehemently that, indeed, it does make a great deal of difference, they are only admitting that they do know something about Vermeer and van Meegeren and the history of art and the value and reputation of certain masters. They are only admitting that they do not judge a work of art on purely aesthetic grounds, but also take into account when it was created, by whom, and how great a reputation it or its creator has.

See also
 A priori and a posteriori
 Analytic–synthetic distinction
 Case brief
 Demarcation problem
 Epistemology
 
 Fact–value distinction
 Falsifiability
 Is–ought problem
 Lord Advocate's Reference
 Problem of induction

References 

Evidence law
Philosophy of law